Page is an unincorporated community in Le Flore County, Oklahoma, United States.

History
A post office was established at Page, Indian Territory on April 6, 1896.  It was named for William C. Page, a prominent Choctaw Indian.

At the time of its founding, Page was located in Wade County, a part of the Apukshunnubbee District of the Choctaw Nation.

References

Unincorporated communities in Le Flore County, Oklahoma
Unincorporated communities in Oklahoma